Pavel Uvarov (born 9 February 1971) is a Kyrgyzstani former modern pentathlete. He competed in the men's individual event at the 2004 Summer Olympics.

References

External links
 

1971 births
Living people
Kyrgyzstani male modern pentathletes
Olympic modern pentathletes of Kyrgyzstan
Modern pentathletes at the 2004 Summer Olympics
People from Kara-Balta
Asian Games medalists in modern pentathlon
Modern pentathletes at the 2002 Asian Games
Fencers at the 2002 Asian Games
Asian Games silver medalists for Kyrgyzstan
Medalists at the 2002 Asian Games
20th-century Kyrgyzstani people